Etsuko Kobayashi (born 10 April 1992) is a Japanese cricketer. She played for Japanese cricket team in the 2013 Women's World Twenty20 Qualifier. She was also the part of the national team at the 2014 Asian Games.

References

External links 
 
 Profile at CricHQ

1992 births
Living people
Japanese women cricketers
Cricketers at the 2014 Asian Games
Asian Games competitors for Japan
Sportspeople from Yamagata Prefecture